The 2000–01 Wollongong Wolves FC season was the club's 21st season since its establishment in 1980. The club participated in the National Soccer League for the 20th time. They were crowned runners-up in the premiership and the champions of the finals series. They were also champions for the first time of the Oceania Club Championship from their first attempt. For the period between 16 December 2000 and 2 March 2001 the club went on an unbeaten run of 18 competitive games. This included seven consecutive wins in the 2001 Oceania Club Championship and 11 league games.

Players

Squad

Source: WorldFootball

Transfers in

Transfers out

Technical staff

Statistics

Squad statistics

Competitions

Overall

National Soccer League

League table

Results summary

Results by round

Matches

Finals series

Oceania Champions League

Group stage

Knockout stage

Semi-finals

Final

FIFA Club World Championship

As winners of the 2001 Oceania Club Championship, the Wollongong Wolves was one of the 12 teams that were invited to the 2001 FIFA Club World Championship, which would be hosted in Spain from 28 July to 12 August 2001. However, the tournament was cancelled, primarily due to the collapse of ISL, which was marketing partner of FIFA at the time.

Group stage

References

External links
 Official Website

Wollongong Wolves FC seasons